Anthony Anderson is a convicted British murderer.

He is most notable for successfully challenging the Home Secretary's powers to set minimum terms for life sentence prisoners. On 25 November 2002, the Law Lords ruled in favour of Anderson's claim that it was incompatible with human rights for politicians to set minimum terms for life sentence prisoners, and the next day the European Court of Human Rights agreed with this decision, meaning that politicians in European countries can no longer decide the minimum length of imprisonment for anyone serving a life sentence.

British politicians had already been stripped of their powers five years earlier to set minimum terms for prisoners aged under 18 after the High Court ruled that Michael Howard had acted unlawfully by deciding that the juvenile killers of toddler James Bulger should spend at least 15 years in custody.

Anderson's successful challenge was a test case which affected approximately 225 convicted British murderers who had been given recommended minimum terms at their trial, only for the term to be increased by the Home Secretary at a later date.

He had been sentenced to life imprisonment in 1988 on two charges of murder. His first victim was Thomas Walker, aged 60, who died in September 1986 after being punched and kicked by Anderson during a burglary. Anderson's next victim was 35-year-old Michael Tierney, who died in May 1987, having also been killed by Anderson in a burglary. The trial judge sentenced Anderson to life imprisonment and recommended that he should serve a minimum of 15 years before being considered for parole, which would keep him in prison until at least 2003.

Six years after Anderson's trial, Home Secretary Michael Howard increased Anderson's minimum term to 20 years, meaning that he would now have to wait until at least 2008 before release could be even considered.

Anderson had tried to challenge the Home Secretary's tariff-setting powers earlier, but his first case in February 2001 failed.

References 

Living people
Year of birth missing (living people)
People convicted of murder by England and Wales
Prisoners sentenced to life imprisonment by England and Wales
English people convicted of murder
English prisoners sentenced to life imprisonment
1986 murders in the United Kingdom
1986 in England
1987 murders in the United Kingdom
1987 in England